Diogo Ferreira Salomão (born 14 September 1988) is a Portuguese professional footballer who plays as a left winger for C.F. Estrela da Amadora.

Club career
Born in Amadora, Lisbon District, Salomão played for three teams as a youth, including two spells at local C.F. Estrela da Amadora. In 2007 he made his senior debut, helping another club from the region, Casa Pia AC, promote from the regional leagues to the fourth division in his first season.

In the 2009–10 campaign, Salomão started in all but one of the league games he appeared in for Real SC, helping the side to the 12th position in the third tier. He subsequently moved straight into the Primeira Liga, as he signed a four-year contract with Sporting CP.

Salomão made his debut in the top flight on 26 September 2010, playing 45 minutes in a 1–1 home draw against C.D. Nacional. He finished his first season with the Lions with 23 official matches – four goals, including two in the UEFA Europa League group stage against PFC Levski Sofia (5–0 home win) and K.A.A. Gent (5–1, also at home)– and, although not a regular starter for the club, showed glimpses of his talent, being compared by many to Portuguese international Nani.

On 28 June 2011, deemed surplus to requirements by new Sporting boss Domingos Paciência as several Portuguese players, Salomão was loaned to Deportivo de La Coruña in Spain, in a season-long move. He contributed four goals in his 16 starts and 1,475 minutes of action in total, as the Galicians returned to La Liga after only one year.

Salomão was again loaned to Depor in 2012–13, being joined in the team by Sporting teammate André Santos. He made his debut in the top division on 20 October 2012, playing 11 minutes in a 4–5 home loss to FC Barcelona.

Salomão returned to Sporting in summer 2013, being assigned to the reserves in the Segunda Liga. On 18 January 2014, he returned to Deportivo again in a temporary deal; after achieving another top-flight promotion, he extended his stay for another year on 23 July.

On 23 May 2015, in only his sixth league appearance of the season, Salomão helped his team come from behind by scoring in the 76th minute of a 2–2 draw at Barcelona in the last round that prevented relegation. He left Sporting in late January 2016, to sign with Segunda División club RCD Mallorca.

On 27 June 2017, Salomão joined Liga I's FC Dinamo București. On 2 February 2019, after 62 competitive games, he left Romania, moving the same day to Al-Hazem F.C. of the Saudi Professional League at the request of Romanian coach Daniel Isăilă.

Salomão returned to the Romanian top tier on 16 July 2019, signing a contract with FCSB. The following 31 January, the free agent moved back to Portugal and its main league with C.D. Santa Clara.

International career
In July 2011, Salomão turned down an offer from manager Luís Norton de Matos to represent his ancestral Guinea-Bissau at international level. His only appearance for the Portugal under-21 team consisted of 12 minutes in a 0–2 friendly home loss against Sweden in Anadia on 2 March 2010, after coming on as a substitute for S.C. Olhanense's Rabiola.

Club statistics

References

External links
 

1988 births
Living people
People from Amadora
Portuguese sportspeople of Bissau-Guinean descent
Sportspeople from Lisbon District
Portuguese footballers
Association football wingers
Primeira Liga players
Liga Portugal 2 players
Segunda Divisão players
C.F. Estrela da Amadora players
Casa Pia A.C. players
Real S.C. players
Sporting CP footballers
Sporting CP B players
C.D. Santa Clara players
La Liga players
Segunda División players
Deportivo de La Coruña players
RCD Mallorca players
Liga I players
FC Dinamo București players
FC Steaua București players
Saudi Professional League players
Al-Hazem F.C. players
Portugal under-21 international footballers
Portuguese expatriate footballers
Expatriate footballers in Spain
Expatriate footballers in Romania
Expatriate footballers in Saudi Arabia
Portuguese expatriate sportspeople in Spain
Portuguese expatriate sportspeople in Romania
Portuguese expatriate sportspeople in Saudi Arabia